Vikarabad railway station is an Indian Railways station in the town of Vikarabad in Telangana. It is located on the Vikarabad–Parli section of Secunderabad railway division in South Central Railway zone.

History 
The Wadi–Secunderabad line was built in 1874 with financing by the Nizam of Hyderabad. It later became part of Nizam's Guaranteed State Railway

References

Railway stations in Ranga Reddy district
Secunderabad railway division